Shahi Jan (also Romanized as Shāhī Jān; also known as Chenār-e Shāhī Jān and Chenar Shahijan) is a village in Ramjerd-e Do Rural District, Dorudzan District, Marvdasht County, Fars Province, Iran. At the 2006 census, its population was 374, in 80 families.

References 

Populated places in Marvdasht County